Japanese Venezuelans (Nikkei Benezuerajin) are Venezuelan citizens who have full or partial Japanese ancestry. The first wave of Japanese came to Venezuela on 1931.

Language
Most Japanese Venezuelans only speak Spanish. Only a selected number can speak Japanese, while those with higher education speak English. There are even a number of Japanese Venezuelan schools that offer English language teaching to the recent Japanese residents.

Religion
The majority of Japanese Venezuelans are Roman Catholic Christians, while the rest are Buddhists.

Notable individuals
 Kaori F. Yonekura, filmmaker
 Hanshi Gijin Hiramatsu, martial artist
 Alexander Cabrera Suzuki, baseball player
 Hana Kobayashi, singer 
 Yoshikatsu Yoshida, mathematician  
 Henry Zakka, actor

Notes

References
 Masterson, Daniel M. and Sayaka Funada-Classen. (2004), The Japanese in Latin America: The Asian American Experience. Urbana, Illinois: University of Illinois Press. ; 
 La inmigración japónesa en Venezuela (1928-2008). (The Japanese immigration in Venezuela. 1928-2008)

 
Venezuelans
Ethnic groups in Venezuela
Venezuelans
Japan–Venezuela relations